The Pete Holmes Show is an American late-night talk show starring comedian Pete Holmes. It aired Monday through Thursday at midnight on TBS, from October 28, 2013 until June 18, 2014. The show was atypical among late-night talk shows for having personal as opposed to topical monologues, more sketch comedy, and taking place within a one-hour format.

History

Pilot episodes and pre-production
In July 2012, Pete Holmes and Conan O'Brien began developing a show called The Midnight Show with Pete Holmes. Three pilot episodes were shot on the Conan set on August 21 and August 23, 2012. On February 26, 2013, it was announced that the show had been picked up for a seven-week run. On July 19, 2013, it was revealed that the show would be titled The Pete Holmes Show. Pete Holmes officially began work on the show on September 23, 2013. Pete Holmes hosted a panel promoting the show at the 2013 New York Comic Con, showing the show's Ex-Men sketch and a CollegeHumor sketch with his Badman character. Test shows were shot on October 16 and 18, 2013.

Debut
The debut episode was taped on Tuesday, October 22 and aired on October 28, 2013. The show began with a cold open sketch called "Ex-Men" (a parody of X-Men) in which Pete played Professor X firing Wolverine for being useless. In the monologue Pete told a story of going to an Enrique Iglesias concert. Pete also visited Daily Show host Jon Stewart in New York to seek advice for hosting a talk show. The interview segment featured comedian and long-time friend Kumail Nanjiani as the first guest, and the show closed with the segment "All the Games" in which the titles of lesser-known (fake) video games were shown. The first episode was viewed by approximately 407,000 people.

Run and cancellation
A total of 28 episodes aired in the show's first season in 2013. On January 8, 2014, the show was renewed for a 13-week second season, beginning on February 24. The show was broadcast Monday through Thursday on TBS at midnight in the United States.

On May 23, 2014, TBS announced the cancellation of The Pete Holmes Show, citing insufficient audience numbers. The show's second and final season ended in June 2014.

Format and production
In the show's first season, episodes began with a cold open pre-taped sketch, were followed by the opening titles, and a personal monologue delivered by Holmes. After the first commercial break, a remote segment or another sketch was shown, or a live comedy bit was performed. The third segment was a short interview, usually with another comedian. The show would close with another short comedy piece. The show's second run featured a less formal structure, relying more heavily on pre-taped interviews. Most notably, the final episode entirely lacked a monologue, and was closed with the show's only musical performance ("Poke" by Scott Hutchison of Frightened Rabbit). Unlike most late-night talk shows (including its lead-in, Conan), The Pete Holmes Show had a 60-minute format.

The show was taped in front of a live studio audience on Stage 10 of the Warner Bros. lot in Burbank, California. For budgetary reasons, shows were not taped on the days they air. Conan O'Brien, Jeff Ross, Nick Bernstein, and Dave Rath are presumed to have been involved in production. Show highlights were posted on Pete Holmes's YouTube account.

Episodes

Season 1 (2013)

October

November

December

Season 2 (2014)

February

March

April

May

June

References

External links

2010s American late-night television series
2013 American television series debuts
2014 American television series endings
2010s American television talk shows
2010s American variety television series
English-language television shows
TBS (American TV channel) original programming
Television series by Conaco